The International Festival of Animated Objects is a biennial festival sponsored by the non-profit group Calgary Animated Objects Society that promotes the arts of puppetry, mask, and animated objects. It takes place in downtown Calgary, Alberta, Canada.

The IFAO features high calibre local, national, and international artists working in the realm of animated objects.  Programming includes live performances, screenings, lectures, workshops, and exhibitions for all ages, and adult audiences, including the ever-popular late night "Dolly Wiggler Cabaret" and "Opening Night Galabash".

Past programming has included Canadian marionette superstar Ronnie Burkett, BC spectacle artists Three on the Tree, Tsimphisan carver Victor Reece, Cirque du Soleil artist Mooky Cornish, Phillip Huber (of "Being John Malkovich" marionette fame), Frank Meschkuleit ("Bride of Chucky", "The Left Hand of Frank"), Calgary's The Old Trout Puppet Workshop, Red Smarteez, and Czech group Buchty a Loutky, amongst others.

Puppets on Film is the screening portion of the International Festival of Animated Objects.  Submissions for the film portion may be made through Withoutabox.

Supporting the IFAO are the following organizations:
 Canadian Heritage
 Human Resources Development Canada
 Alberta Lotteries
 Alberta Foundation for the Arts
 Alberta Human Resources
 Calgary Arts Development

External links
Official Website
 CAOS Website
 Glenbow Museum
 Golden Sheaf Awards
 VTape
 Prairie Tales
 Phillip Huber
 Frank Meschkuleit
 Cirque du Soleil Varekai
 The Old Trout Puppet Workshop
 The Red Smarteez
 Ronnie Burkett
 Buchty a Loutky

Press Links
 AMMSA
 Calgary Herald
 Canadian Theatre Review
 FFWD 2009 Festival Preview
 FFWD 2009 Crawdaddy Review
 Calgary Herald 2009 Les Voisins Review
 Calgary Herald 2009 Alice Nelson Review

Puppet festivals
Festivals in Calgary
Art festivals in Canada
Puppetry in Canada